Keraunea is a genus of flowering plants belonging to the family Convolvulaceae.

Its native range is Eastern Brazil.

Species:

Keraunea brasiliensis 
Keraunea capixaba

References

Convolvulaceae
Convolvulaceae genera
Taxa named by Martin Cheek